Geitonogamy (from Greek geiton (γείτων) = neighbor + gamein (γαμεῖν) = to marry) is a type of self-pollination. Geitonogamous pollination is sometimes distinguished from the fertilizations that can result from it, geitonogamy. If a plant is self-incompatible, geitonogamy can reduce seed production.

Geitonogamy is when pollen is exported using a vector (pollinator or wind) out of one flower but only to another flower on the same plant. It is a form of self-fertilization.

In flowering plants, pollen is transferred from a flower to another flower on the same plant, and in animal pollinated systems this is accomplished by a pollinator visiting multiple flowers on the same plant. Geitonogamy is also possible within species that are wind-pollinated, and may actually be a quite common source of self-fertilized seeds in self-compatible species. It also occurs in monoecious gymnosperms. Although geitonogamy is functionally cross-pollination involving a pollinating agent, genetically it is similar to autogamy since the pollen grains come from the same plant.

Monoecious plants like maize show geitonogamy. Geitonogamy is not possible for strictly dioecious plants, namely those with separate male and female flowers on different plants.

See also
 Plant reproductive morphology
 Self-fertilization
Autogamy Depression

References 

Pollination
Plant reproduction